

Costa Rica 
 1921 War of Coto (against Panama)
 1948 Costa Rican Civil War

Guatemala
1524 — 1697 Spanish conquest of Guatemala

1530 Alvarado enslaves the Mayan kingdoms of Cakchiquel, Mam, and Ixil.
1811 1811 Independence Movement
1823 — 1838 Federal Republic of Central America Independence and annexation by the Mexican Empire
1896 — 1898 Greater Republic of Central America
1960 — 1996 Central American crisis
1960 — 1996 Guatemalan Civil War

Nicaragua
1898 — 1934 Banana Wars
September 19, 1912 Battle of Masaya
October 3, 1912 — October 4, 1912 Battle of Coyotepe Hill
May 16, 1927 Battle of La Paz Centro
July 16, 1927 Battle of Ocotal
July 25, 1927 Battle of San Fernando
July 27, 1927 Battle of Santa Clara
September 19, 1927 Battle of Telpaneca
October 9, 1927 Battle of Sapotillal
January 1, 1928 Battle of Las Cruces
February 27, 1928 — February 28, 1928 Battle of El Bramadero
May 13, 1928 — May 14, 1928 Battle of La Flor
December 31, 1930 Battle of Achuapa
September 16, 1932 Battle of Agua Carta
December 26, 1932 Battle of El Sauce
1926 — 1927 Nicaraguan civil war
1960 — 1996 Central American crisis
1961 — 1990 Nicaraguan Revolution

El Salvador
1885 — Intentona de barrios
1969 Football War
1960 — 1996 Central American crisis
1979 — 1992 Salvadoran Civil War
December 11, 1981 El Mozote massacre
August 21, 1982 — August 22, 1982 El Calabozo massacre
June 19, 1985 21:30 Zona Rosa attacks
November 16, 1989 Murder of UCA scholars

Honduras
1860 — 1861 Priest War
1898 — 1931 Banana Wars
1903 — Honduran amed conflict of 1903
1907 — Honduran armed conflict of 1907
1919 — First Honduran Civil War
1924 — Second Honduran Civil War
1924 — Honduran armed uprising of 1824
1931 — Third Honduran civil war
1957 — Morocón War 
1969 — Football War
1979 — 1996 Central American crisis
1982 — 1986 Battalion 3-16 was responsible for the kidnapping, torture, disappearance and murder of at least 184 Honduran students, professors, journalists, human rights activists and others

Panama
1921 War of Coto (against Costa Rica)
1960 — 1996 Central American crisis
1989 — 1990 United States invasion of Panama
December 20, 1989 Operation Acid Gambit
December 23, 1989 Operation Nifty Package

Belize
1981 Heads of Agreement Crisis

See also
List of conflicts in North America
List of conflicts in South America
List of conflicts in Europe
List of conflicts in Africa
List of conflicts in Asia
List of conflicts in the Near East
List of conflicts in the Middle East
List of wars
 Central America
 History of Central America

Central America
Conflicts
Conflicts
Conflicts